The fifth season of My Hero Academia anime television series was produced by Bones and directed by Kenji Nagasaki (chief director) and Masahiro Mukai, following the story of the original manga series from the 21st volume through the end of the 26th volume. It covers the final parts of "Pro Hero" arc (chapters 190–193), "Joint Training" (chapters 194–217), "Meta Liberation Army" (chapters 218–240) which temporarily shifts the title of the series to My Villain Academia, "Endeavor Agency" (chapters 241–252), and the origin of "Paranormal Liberation War" arc (chapters 253–258).

The season follows Izuku Midoriya, who dreams about the vestiges of the previous One For All users during the Joint Training Battle. In the second half of the season, the League of Villains and the Meta Liberation Army encountered in the Deika City to determine about becoming the most infamous villains; Tomura Shigaraki, who is informed to become All For One's successor, seeks to merge the organizations under his leadership. At the same time, the Hero Public Safety Commission orders a second Hero Work-Studies for students in preparation for the upcoming War.

The fifth season aired from March 27 to September 25, 2021, on ytv and NTV. Funimation, Crunchyroll, and Hulu are streaming the season outside of Asia as it airs, and an English dub from Funimation launched on its service on April 10, 2021. Medialink licensed the series in Southeast Asia and South Asia, and is streaming the season on Netflix, Viu, Bilibili, WeTV, iQIYI, meWATCH, and other regional streaming services. The season premiered on Adult Swim's Toonami programming block on May 9, and ended on November 7, 2021.



Episode list

Home video release

Japanese
Toho released the fifth season of the anime on DVD and Blu-ray in four volumes in Japan, with the first volume released on July 21, 2021, and the final volume released on January 19, 2022.

English
Funimation released the first part of the fifth season on home video on March 29, 2022 and the second part on December 19, 2022.

Notes

References

My Hero Academia episode lists
2021 Japanese television seasons